Foreign Affairs is a British sitcom that aired on BBC1 in 1966. Starring Leslie Phillips in the lead role, it was set in the Foreign Office in Whitehall. The entire series was wiped and is no longer thought to exist.

Background
All six episodes were written by writing partners Johnny Mortimer and Brian Cooke, with creator Leonard Samson also co-writing one episode. Foreign Affairs introduced the writers to young actor Richard O'Sullivan and this would lead to his title role in the 1970s sitcom Man About the House.

Cast
Leslie Phillips - Dennis Proudfoot
Richard O'Sullivan - Taplow
Austin Trevor - Sir Hugh Marriot
Dorothy Frere - Miss Jessup
Ronnie Barker - Grischa Petrovitch
Joe Melia - Serge Volchanivov
Sonia Graham - Irinka

Plot
Womaniser Dennis Proudfoot works in the Foreign Office in Whitehall as the personal assistant to Sir Hugh Marriot, the administrator of foreign relations. The programme focuses on the conflicts between the Foreign Office and the counterparts at the Soviet Embassy in London. Serge Volchanivov is the commissar for foreign relations and his assistant is Grischa Petrovitch. Taplow is the 20-year-old post-room boy.

Episodes
Foreign Affairs aired on Fridays at 7.30pm. Due to the archival policies of the time, all six episodes were subsequently wiped and no longer exist.

References

1966 British television series debuts
1966 British television series endings
1960s British sitcoms
BBC television sitcoms
Lost BBC episodes